Titea is a genus of butterflies in the family Lycaenidae.

Species include:
Titea caerula Tite, 1963
Titea extensa Bethune-Baker, 1906
Titea sublutea Tite, 1963

References

Luciini
Lycaenidae genera